Derlwyn is a small village in the  community of Llandysul, Ceredigion, Wales, which is 61.4 miles (98.8 km) from Cardiff and 180.9 miles (291.1 km) from London. Derlwyn is represented in the Senedd by Elin Jones (Plaid Cymru) and is part of the Ceredigion constituency in the House of Commons.

See also
List of localities in Wales by population

References

Villages in Ceredigion
Llandysul